Robert Hills (26 June 1769 – 14 May 1844) was an English painter and etcher. 

Hills was born in Islington. He initially studied under John Alexander Gresse, then enrolled at the Royal Academy of Arts in 1788. He primarily painted rural scenes, particularly farm animals. A number of his renderings can now be found at the British Museum.

Hills was known to draw animals in works of other artists, such as George Barret, Jr. and George Fennell Robson. He published Sketches in Flanders and Holland (1816), with his own aquatints.

External links and references
 Engraving by Edward Francis Finden of the painting  with a poetical illustration by Letitia Elizabeth Landon in Forget Me Not annual for 1827.

1769 births
1844 deaths
18th-century English painters
English male painters
19th-century English painters
People from Islington (district)
Painters from London
19th-century English male artists
18th-century English male artists